Aspect is a term used across several religions and in theology to describe a particular manifestation or conception of a deity or other divine being. Depending on the religion, these might be disjoint or overlapping parts, or methods of perceiving or conceptualizing the deity in a particular context.

In the Baháʼí Faith, this might be conceived as a Manifestation of God.

In Christianity, Trinitarianism (see Trinity) is the belief in God as three distinct Persons in one Divinity, all of One Being, not confounding the Substance nor dividing the Essence: as such it would be false and indeed heretical (Sabellianism), from the perspective of orthodox Christianity, to conceive of one God manifested in three separate aspects or modes.

In some conceptions of Hinduism, Vishnu is seen as an aspect of Brahman.

In Sikhism, there are three distinct aspects: God as deity; God in relation to creation; and God in relation to man.

References

Conceptions of God
Trinitarianism